The 2014 Grand Prix Cycliste de Montréal was the fifth edition of the Grand Prix Cycliste de Montréal, a single-day professional bicycle road race. It was the 26th event of the 2014 UCI World Tour season. The race is one of the only two events which are part of the World Tour calendar in North America, the other one being the 2014 Grand Prix Cycliste de Québec contested two days earlier.

Teams 
As the Grand Prix Cycliste de Montréal was a UCI World Tour event, all 18 UCI ProTeams were invited automatically and obligated to send a squad. A Canadian national squad also competed in the race, and as such, forming the event's 19-team peloton.

The 19 teams that competed in the race were:

Canada (national team) †

Course 
The race consisted of 17 laps of a circuit  in length, and followed the same path as the 2011 edition. The circuit, around the main campus of the Université de Montréal, was well-suited for climbers and punchers with three climbs per lap. The finish was on an uphill climb with a small gradient of 4%, that was located on Avenue du Parc. There was a sharp, 180 degrees bend to the right situated 500 meters away from the line.  The total vertical climb of the race was 3,893 meters. The major difficulties were:

Kilometre 2: Côte Camilien-Houde: 1,8 kilometres, average gradient of 8%
Kilometre 6: Côte de la Polytechnque: 780 metres, average gradient of 6% with a pass of 200 metres at 11%
Kilometre 11: Avenue du Parc: 560 metres, average gradient of 4%

Results

References

External links 
 

2014
2014 UCI World Tour
Grand Prix Cycliste de Montreal
2014 in Quebec